The Second Sunday of Easter is the day that occurs seven days after the Christian celebration of Easter. Those churches which give special significance to this day recognize it by various names. In the Roman Rite of the Catholic Church, this day is generally known as Divine Mercy Sunday. Across Western Christianity more broadly, this day is also known as the Octave Day of Easter, White Sunday, Quasimodo (or Quasimodogeniti) Sunday, Bright Sunday, and Low Sunday. In Eastern Christianity, this day is known as Antipascha, New Sunday (or Renewal Sunday), and Thomas Sunday.

Biblical account 

The Second Sunday of Easter is the eighth day after Easter using the mode of inclusive counting, according to which Easter itself is the first day of the eight. Christian traditions which commemorate this day recall the Biblical account recorded to have happened on the same eighth day after the original Resurrection.

It is because of this Scriptural episode that this day is called Thomas Sunday in the Eastern tradition.

Western Christianity

Names

White Sunday 
In early Roman Rite liturgical books, Easter Week used to be known as "White Week", because of the white robes worn during that week by those who had been baptized at the Easter Vigil. A pre-Tridentine edition of the Catholic Church's Roman Missal, published in 1474, called Saturday in albis, short for in albis depositis or in albis deponendis (of removal of the white garments), a name that was kept in subsequent Tridentine versions of the missal for that Saturday. In the 1604 edition of the Tridentine missal (but not in the original 1570 edition), the description in albis was applied also to the following Sunday, the octave day of Easter.

The 1962 Roman Missal (still in limited use today) refers to this Sunday as Dominica in albis in octava Paschæ. The name in albis was dropped in the 1970 revision.

Quasimodo Sunday 

Translated into English:

Low Sunday 

Another name traditionally given to this day in the English language is Low Sunday. The word "low" may serve to contrast it with the "high" festival of Easter on the preceding Sunday. Or, the word "low" may be a corruption of the Latin word laudes, the first word of a sequence used in the historical Sarum Rite.

Divine Mercy Sunday 

On April 30, 2000, Pope John Paul II designated the Second Sunday of Easter as Divine Mercy Sunday, based on a petition by St. Faustina Kowalska (19051938), who said that Jesus had made this request of the Church in an apparition. In the Roman Missal, the official title of this day is "Second Sunday of Easter; or, Sunday of Divine Mercy".

Five years later, Pope John Paul II died the evening before Divine Mercy Sunday, on Saturday, April 2, 2005. His successor, Pope Benedict XVI, beatified him also on a Divine Mercy Sunday, on May 1, 2011.

Celebrations 

In the Catholic Church, special Divine Mercy celebrations often take place on this day, and the Sacrament of Reconciliation is often administered.

The Italian feast of Our Lady of the Hens and the Chilean  festival are held on this day. Both festivals include Eucharistic processions.

Eastern Christianity 

In Eastern Christianity, this Sunday is called Antipascha, meaning "in place of Easter". It is also called Thomas Sunday due to the Gospel passage read in the Divine Liturgy. Another name for this day in Eastern Christianity is "New Sunday". This Sunday has many hallmarks of a Great Feast, despite not actually being one. For example, no Resurrection texts from the Octoechos are sung, there is a Polyeleos and magnification, the Matins Gospel is read from the Royal Doors and there is no veneration of the Gospel Book, and the Great Prokimenon 'Who is so great a God as our God?' is sung at Vespers on Sunday evening.

In popular culture 
 Quasimodo, the fictional protagonist of Victor Hugo's 1831 French novel Notre Dame de Paris (or The Hunchback of Notre Dame), was, in the novel, found abandoned on the doorsteps of Notre Dame Cathedral on the Sunday after Easter. In the words of the story: "He baptized his adopted child and called him Quasimodo, either because he wanted to indicate thereby the day on which he had found him, or because he wanted the name to typify just how incomplete and half-finished the poor little creature was."

See also 
 Octave of Easter
 Bright Week

Notes

References 

Christian Sunday observances
Eastern Orthodox liturgical days